Robert 'Plumber' Brown (2 February 1860 – 2 December 1940) was a Scottish footballer.

Career
Brown was one of two contemporary players of the same name who both played for Dumbarton and Scotland. To distinguish them, they were given nicknames 'Plumber' and 'Sparrow'.

Honours
Dumbarton
 Scottish Cup: Winners 1882–83
Runners Up 1886–87
 Dumbartonshire Cup: Winners 1884–85
 Glasgow Charity Cup: Runners Up 1884–85
 4 representative caps for Dumbartonshire
 1 representative cap for Scotch Counties.

References

External links

London Hearts profile
Robert Brown (The Sons Archive - Dumbarton Football Club History)

1860 births
1940 deaths
Scottish footballers
Scotland international footballers
Dumbarton F.C. players
Association football inside forwards
Footballers from Motherwell